The Whirlwind is the third studio album by the band Transatlantic, released on October 23, 2009. It is available in three formats: a standard edition, a double disc special edition and a deluxe edition with a 105-minute making-of DVD.

The main album, while indexed into twelve tracks, is considered one song. It is represented as one track on the band's third and fourth live album Whirld Tour 2010: Live in London and More Never Is Enough: Live In Manchester & Tilburg 2010 respectively.

The bonus disc (which comes with the Special and Deluxe Editions) includes eight new studio recordings: four original Transatlantic songs and four cover songs, which are "The Return of the Giant Hogweed" by Genesis, "A Salty Dog" by Procol Harum, a combination of America's and The Beatles "I Need You" and Santana's "Soul Sacrifice". At the end of the second disc, there is a hidden track by the band, played on ukulele with vocals.

The album peaked number 21 in the Top Heatseekers chart and number 45 in the German album chart.

Track listing
Written and arranged by Transatlantic.

Special edition bonus disc

Notes
"I Need You" is a combination of The Beatles' "I Need You" and America's "I Need You"
"Soul Sacrifice" ends at 8:38, followed by a short silence and a hidden untitled track.

Critical reception
In 2020, The Whirlwind was named best progressive rock album of the last 20 years (2000-2019) by The Prog Report.

Personnel

Transatlantic
Neal Morse – keyboards, acoustic guitars, percussion, and vocals
Mike Portnoy – drums and vocals
Roine Stolt – electric guitars, vocals, percussion, additional mellotron, minimoog & soundscapes
Pete Trewavas – bass guitar, vocals, occasional VST Synthesizer & orchestration

Additional musicians
Chris Carmichael – strings
Marc Papeghin – French horn

Production
Arranged & Produced by Transatlantic
Engineered by Jerry Guidroz
Mixed by Richard Mouser
Mastered by Robert Vosigen at Capitol Mastering, Hollywood CA

Charts

External links
Encyclopaedia Metallum page

References

2009 albums
Transatlantic (band) albums
Metal Blade Records albums
Inside Out Music albums